Bottegoa is a genus of plant in family Rutaceae. It contains the following species (but this list may be incomplete):
 Bottegoa insignis, Chiov.

References 

 
Rutaceae genera
Taxonomy articles created by Polbot